Trinity Mountain is the highest point in the Trinity Mountains, a subrange of the Boise Mountains in Boise National Forest, Idaho with a summit elevation of . Trinity Mountain is within the watershed of the South Fork Boise River.

References 

Mountains of Idaho
Mountains of Elmore County, Idaho
Boise National Forest